Across the Desert is a 1936 German adventure film directed by Johann Alexander Hübler-Kahla and starring Fred Raupach, Heinz Evelt and Aruth Wartan. It was based on a novel by Karl May. It was the first sound adaptation of a May novel, and the only one to be produced during the Nazi era. Set in the Ottoman Empire during the Nineteenth century, it portrays a series of oriental adventures of the two travellers Kara Ben Nemsi and Hadschi Halef Omar.

It was shot on location in Egypt, and at the Johannisthal Studios in Berlin.

Cast
 Fred Raupach as Kara Ben Nemsi
 Heinz Evelt as Hadschi Halef Omar
 Erich Haußmann as Abu Seif
 Gretl Wawra as Hanneh
 Aruth Wartan as Scheik Malek
 Katharina Berger as Senitza
 Herbert Gernot as Abu Seif's butler
 Franz Klebusch as Plaza men
 Bertold Reissig as Abu Seif's friend

References

Bibliography

External links 
 

1936 films
Films of Nazi Germany
German historical adventure films
German black-and-white films
1930s historical adventure films
1930s German-language films
Films directed by Johann Alexander Hübler-Kahla
Films set in the 19th century
Films based on the Orient Cycle
Films shot in Egypt
Films set in deserts
Films shot at Johannisthal Studios
Tobis Film films
Films set in the Ottoman Empire
1930s German films